Puyalón de Cuchas (or simply Puyalón) is an Aragonese left-wing nationalist political party formed in 2008, after a split from the Chunta Aragonesista.

Objectives
The main objectives of Puyalón are achieving full national sovereignty for Aragón and building a socialist society. The party also supports the minority languages of Aragón: Catalan and Aragonese, feminism, ecologism and the integration of immigrants.

History
The first participation by Puyalón in elections was in the local elections of 2011, when the party gained a town councillor in Artieda. In the European elections of 2014 Puyalón supported (and participated in) The Peoples Decide (LPD), gaining 1,241 votes (0.27% of the vote in Aragón). In the municipal elections of 2015 Puyalón gained two town councillors, one in Artieda (Raúl Ramón Iguácel) and another in Pastriz (Rubén Ramos, elected in the list Ganar Pastriz).

In the 2019 Spanish general election Puyalón gained 835 votes (0,11% in Aragon), fielding candidates in all three Aragonese constituencies: Huesca (148 votes 0,12%), Teruel (66 votes, 0,08%) and Zaragroza (621 votes, 0,11%). In the 2019 European parliament election in Spain Puyalón supported the Republics Now coalition, the successor of the 2014 LPD coalition. Republics Now won 1.805 votes (0,27%) in Aragon.

References

Notes

Political parties in Aragon
Secessionist organizations in Europe
Political parties established in 2008
Regionalist parties in Spain
2008 establishments in Spain
Nationalist parties in Spain
Socialist parties in Spain
Ahora Repúblicas